Dante R. Chialvo (born 1956) is a professor at Universidad Nacional de San Martin. Together with Per Bak, they put forward concrete models
considering the brain as a critical system. Initial contributions focussed on mathematical ideas of how learning could benefit from criticality. Further work provided experimental evidence for this conjecture both at large and small scale. He was named Fulbright Scholar in 2005  and elected as a Fellow of the American Physical Society in 2007  and as Member of the Academia de Ciencias de America Latina in 2022.

References

External links
 Chialvo site

Living people
Fellows of the American Physical Society
Complex systems scientists
1956 births
Fulbright alumni